Mary Darcy, Countess of Holderness (c.1721 – 13 October 1801), formerly Mary Doublet, was the wife of Robert Darcy, 4th Earl of Holderness.

Mary was the daughter of Francis Doublet and Constantia Van-der-Beck. She married the earl on 29 October 1743 (or in November 1742).

The couple had three children, only one of whom reached adulthood. They were:
George Darcy, Lord Darcy and Conyers (1745-1747)
Thomas Darcy, Lord Darcy and Conyers (born and died 1750)
Lady Amelia Darcy (1754-1784), who married firstly Francis Osborne, Marquess of Carmarthen, and had children. Following their divorce in 1779, Amelia married John "Mad Jack" Byron, father of Lord Byron, and had one daughter, Augusta Leigh.

From 1770 until her death in 1801, the Countess of Holderness was a Lady of the Bedchamber to Charlotte of Mecklenburg-Strelitz, queen consort of King George III of the United Kingdom.

In 1777, Horace Walpole referred in a letter to "a great breach in the house of Holderness", caused by Amelia and her husband having shielded a young couple who had eloped; her mother is said to have banished her from her presence for this. Amelia died in 1784, and Augusta was largely brought up by her grandmother, the countess, until the latter died in 1801.

The countess's portrait was painted in 1745 by Jean-Étienne Liotard. A sale of her goods, which included paintings, was held in London on 6 March 1802. She was a patron of the poet William Mason, who died in 1797.

References

1720s births
1801 deaths
English countesses
Court of George III of the United Kingdom